Greatest Hits 1990–1992 is a compilation album by American country music artist Tanya Tucker. It was released by Liberty Records in April 1993, containing most of the singles from Tennessee Woman, What Do I Do with Me and Can't Run from Yourself (the Top 10 hit single "Tell Me About It" was omitted). No new material was recorded for the project. The album peaked at number 15 on the Top Country Albums chart and number 65 on the Billboard 200 and was certified Platinum by the RIAA.

Track listing

Chart performance

References

1993 greatest hits albums
Tanya Tucker albums
Liberty Records compilation albums
Albums produced by Jerry Crutchfield